Dancing Lion (Chinese: 醒獅) is a 2007 Hong Kong comedy film directed by and starring Francis Ng. It was co-directed by Marco Mak and co-stars Anthony Wong, Teresa Mo, Lam Chi-chung, Lin Yuan and Hins Cheung.

Cast

External links

Dancing Lion at Hong Kong Cinemagic

2007 films
2007 comedy films
Hong Kong comedy films
2000s Cantonese-language films
Films set in Hong Kong
Films shot in Hong Kong
2000s Hong Kong films